The 2012 Navy Midshipmen football team represented the United States Naval Academy as an independent in the 2012 NCAA Division I FBS football season. The Midshipmen were led by fifth-year head coach Ken Niumatalolo and played their home games at Navy–Marine Corps Memorial Stadium. They finished the season 8–5 and were invited to the Kraft Fight Hunger Bowl, where they were defeated by Arizona State.

Schedule

Roster

Depth chart
The following players comprised the team's Depth chart prior to the 2012 Kraft Fight Hunger Bowl:

Game summaries

Notre Dame

Penn State

VMI

San Jose State

Air Force

Source: ESPN

Central Michigan

Indiana

East Carolina

Florida Atlantic

Troy

Texas State

Army (Rivalry) (Commander in Chief's Trophy)

Kraft Fight Hunger Bowl: Arizona State

References

Navy
Navy Midshipmen football seasons
Navy Midshipmen football